A complete list of songs by the American actress, singer and songwriter "Raven-Symoné".

Album songs 
All songs that appear on studio albums released by Raven-Symoné.

A
 "Alice" (This Is My Time, 2004)
 "Anti-Love Song" (Raven-Symoné, 2008)

B
 "Backflip" (This Is My Time, 2004)
 "Best Friends" (Undeniable, 1999)
 "Betcha Didn't Know" (Here's to New Dreams, 1993)
 "Boring" (Infrasounds, 2020)
 "Bounce" (Undeniable, 1999)
 "Bu" (Infrasounds, 2020)
 "Bump" (This Is My Time, 2004)

C
 "Cleo" (Infrasounds, 2020)
 "Cruise Control" (released via SoundCloud Account)

D
 "Double Dutch Bus" (Raven-Symoné, 2008)

F
 "Face to Face" (Raven-Symoné (Australian edition), 2008; Thick Girls, Big Girls - EP, 2008; Secrets EP, 2008)
 "First Day of School" (Here's to New Dreams, 1993)
 "Fun Tonight" (Here's to New Dreams, 1993)

G
 "Ghost" (feat. Domino) (Infrasounds, 2020)
 "Girl Get It" (Raven-Symoné, 2008)
 "Grazing in the Grass" (This Is My Time, 2004)
 "Green" (Raven-Symoné, 2008)

H
 "Here's to New Dreams" (Here's to New Dreams, 1993)
 "Hip Hop Teddybear" (Here's to New Dreams, 1993)
 "Hip Hoppers" (Undeniable, 1999)
 "Hollywood Life" (Raven-Symoné, 2008)

I
 "I Can Get Down" (Undeniable, 1999)
 "I Love You" (Undeniable, 1999)
 "In the Pictures" (Raven-Symoné, 2008)
 "In Your Skin" (Raven-Symoné, 2008)

J
 "Just Fly Away" (This Is My Time, 2004)

K
 "Keep a Friend" (Raven-Symoné, 2008)

L
 "Lean on Me" (Undeniable, 1999)
 "Left Behind" (33000 EP, 2019)
 "Life Is Beautiful" (This Is My Time, 2004)
 "Love Me or Leave Me" (Raven-Symoné, 2008)

M
 "Magic In the Air" (Infrasounds, 2020)
 "Microdosing" (33000 EP, 2019)
 "Mystify" (This Is My Time, 2004)

N
 "Napswag" (Infrasounds, 2020)
 "Next" (Thick Girls, Big Girls - EP, 2008)

O
 "Ooh Boy" (Here's to New Dreams, 1993)
 "Overloved" (This Is My Time, 2004)

P
 "People Make the World Go Round" (Undeniable, 1999)
 "Pure Love" (Undeniable, 1999)

R
 "Rain" (Infrasounds, 2020)
 "Raven Is the Flavor" (Here's to New Dreams, 1993)
 "Raven's Lullaby" (Here's to New Dreams, 1993)

S
 "Sarafina" (released via SoundCloud account)
 "Secrets" (Secrets EP, 2008)
 "Set Me Free" (This Is My Time, 2004)
 "Shorts Like Me" (Raven-Symoné, 2008)
 "Skooldayz" (Infrasounds, 2020)
 "Slow Down" (Undeniable, 1999)
 "Spacetruck" (Infrasounds, 2020)
 "Stupid" (Raven-Symoné, 2008)

T
 "That Girl" (Raven-Symoné, 2008)
 "That's What Little Girls Are Made Of" (Here's to New Dreams, 1999)
 "Thick Girls, Big Girls" (Thick Girls, Big Girls - EP, 2009)
 "This Is My Time" (This Is My Time, 2004)
 "Through To You" /> (Secrets EP, 2008)
 "Typical" (This Is My Time, 2004)

W
 "Weird Day" (33000 EP, 2019)
 "What Are You Gonna Do?" (Raven-Symoné, 2008)
 "What Is Love?" (This Is My Time, 2004)
 "What's Real?" (This Is My Time, 2004)
 "With a Child's Heart" (Undeniable, 1999)

Soundtrack releases 
All songs in which Raven-Symoné have recorded for film on soundtrack releases.

Unreleased songs 
Songs that have been written/recorded by Raven-Symoné, but not released on a studio album or otherwise.

 "My Friends"
 "Are You Feelin' Me?"
 "Eviction Letter"
 "Got it Girl"
 "Runaway"
 "Your Friend"
 Ain't Enough

References 

Raven-Symone